Populonia or Populonia Alta (Etruscan: Pupluna, Pufluna or Fufluna, all pronounced Fufluna; Latin: Populonium, Populonia, or Populonii) today is a frazione of the comune of Piombino (Tuscany, central Italy). As of 2009 its population was 17. Populonia is especially noteworthy for its Etruscan remains, including one of the main necropolis in Italy, discovered by Isidoro Falchi.

Description

Modern Populonia is located within a small portion of the walled acropolis of a large ancient city, which covered the entire north end of Monte Massoncello, a promontory, its northern slopes down to the Bay of Baratti, and the shores of the bay, which was its port. The city was an industrial one, smelting copper ore brought from the Colline Metallifere, the "ore-bearing hills" inland, and iron ore from nearby Elba, in beehive blast furnaces. Over the thousand years of its life it came to cover the entire southern shore of the bay with slag, piling it over abandoned residences and cemeteries, until it lost its utility as a metals manufacturer. Then it was abandoned.

The metal-rich slag was reworked for its content by Feromin Co., 1929–1969, which cleaned the shore of the bay and left but little behind. During the process Etruscan necropoleis and other buildings were uncovered. They attracted the attention of the archaeologists. Soon it was realized that not only Populonia but the entire Val di Cornia, Valley of the nearby Cornia River, had been densely populated in Etruscan times. Moreover, the Val had been populated continuously from Paleolithic times. In recognition of the area's importance to archaeology, a system of parks was created, the Parchi della Val di Cornia, with a key park being the Parco archeologico di Baratti e Populonia, the "Baratti and Populonia Archeological Park", which covers the hill with the acropolis and the entire Bay of Baratti and its shores. Another is the Archaeological Area of Poggio del Molino.

The port has long since been replaced by the city of Piombino on the southern slopes of Monte Massoncello, which is the departure point of maritime traffic leading to Elba and elsewhere. The parks and museums host large numbers of visitors; the village at the top has mainly a caretaker function. The heights feature a massive fortress built in the 15th century by the Appiani lords of Piombino, with stones taken from Etruscan remains. The hill has been kept in a disarmingly forested and rural condition. It was once clear and populated. The remains of a city wall go around the top.

Considerable remains of its town walls, of large irregular, roughly rectangular blocks (the form follows the natural spalling of the local schistose sandstone), still enclose a circuit of about 2.5 kilometers. The remains existing within them are entirely Roman—a row of vaulted substructures, a water reservoir and a mosaic with representations of fishes. Strabo mentions the existence here of a lookout tower for the shoals of tuna-fish. There are some tombs outside the town, some of which, ranging from the Villanovan period (9th century BC to the middle of the  3rd century BC), were explored in 1908. In one, a large circular tomb, were found three sepulchral couches in stone, carved in imitation of wood, and a fine statuette in bronze of Ajax committing suicide. Close by was found a horse collar with fourteen bronze bells.

The remains of a temple, devastated in ancient times (possibly by Dionysius I of Syracuse in 384 BC), were also discovered, with fragments in it of Attic vases of the 5th century BC, which had served as ex votos. Coins of the town have also been found in silver and copper. The iron mines of Elba, and the tin and copper of the mainland, were owned and smelted by the people of Populonia; hot springs too lay some 10 km to the east (Aquae Populaniae) on the coastal high road —Via Aurelia. At this point a road branched off to Saena (Siena). According to Virgil, building on a tradition of an ancient alliance with Rome, the town sent a contingent to the help of Aeneas; in historical times it furnished Scipio the Elder with iron in 205 BC. It offered considerable resistance to Sulla, who took it by siege; and from this dates its decline, which Strabo, who describes it well (v. 2, 6, p. 223), already notes as beginning, while four centuries later Rutilius Claudius Namatianus describes it as in ruins.

Etruscan Fufluna

Name
The name of the Etruscan city is known from its coins. It has been suggested that it was named after a god, Fufluns, as other Etruscan cities were named after divinities. It would mean, then, "the city of Fufluns." The word was written in Hellenistic times with the Etruscan letter f, only introduced then. Before then Etruscans and Romans made do with a p, resulting in such spellings as Pupluna or Populonia, but the pronunciation must have been Fufluna. It has been further suggested that Pliny's mention of a statue of Zeus at Populonia carved from one vine (hence very ancient, possible hundreds of years) suggests a pre-metallurgical wine industry flourishing at the time Fufluna was officially named.

Foundation
The earliest evidence of Etruscans at Fufluna is from two necropoleis containing material of the Villanovan culture, which was Iron Age and began about 900 BC. Except for some cities that probably began in the Proto-Villanovan, 900 is the foundation time for the majority of Etruscan urbanizations. The cemeteries are San Cerbone on the south shore of the Bay of Baratti and Piano e Poggio della Granate further north on the bay. The presence of the cemeteries can only be explained by a large settlement nearby, which can only have been Fufluna.

The acropolis of the city extended over two hills at the top of the promontory: Poggio del Castillo, the site of the castle and modern structures, and Poggio del Telegrafo, also called, confusingly, Poggio del Molino, not the only hill of that name in the area. Remains of a Roman villa, Villa le Logge, share Telegrafo with an excavation last conducted in the seasons of 2003–2005, which uncovered among other things postholes from a village of huts of the same date as the Villanovan cemeteries, about 900 BC.

The presence of a few Proto-Villanovan tombs at Villa del Barone on another Poggio del Molino near Punta del Stellino just to the north of Baratti indicates the foundation population was proto-Etruscan. It was excavated in the 1980s by the University of Florence. The Bronze Age Proto-villanovan (which is not part of the Villanovan) began as early as 1200 BC.

Another excavation at another Roman villa on Poggio del Molino near Baroni began in 2009. A report from the second season, 2010, mentions that a Bronze Age village of huts was found under the villa. The excavators date it to "the Late Bronze Age" by the pottery, tentatively assigning it to 1200–1100 BC, a time falling within the Final Bronze Age of the Italian system and also within the Proto-Villanovan Period. They have not yet made any such distinctions. The village is assumed to have been associated with the Populonian population. Throughout the Val di Cornia are remains much older. It cannot be presumed, however, just because the archaeology of the region goes back to the Stone Age, that their populations represent the Proto-Etruscans.

The Poggio del Molino (or Mulino, "the mill") north of Baratti must be associated with Fufluna because of a geographical barrier, not there now, once termed Lake Rimigliano. In Etruscan times it was a lagoon fringed by a barrier island (the current beach area) extending from San Vincenzo in the north southward to the foot of Poggio del Molino, where it was broken by an egress point (today the mouth of an irrigation channel). The lake went as far inland as the mines at Campiglia Marittima, an easy route for ore barges between there and the Bay of Baratti. The lagoon eventually became a swamp, disappearing in favor of agricultural land in 1832. The lagoon and its swamps would have created conditions conducive to malaria, meaning that free Etruscans who could afford it would have preferred to live on the heights.

Around 600 BC, the city joined the confederate Etruscan League or twelve cities. It served as one of the only two port cities.

Proto-historic foundation myths
A number of stories about the foundation of Populonia promulgated by the classical authors concerning these events removed from their times by at least several hundred years, the better part of it prehistoric, have been found to have no basis in any known archaeological fact. Maurus Servius Honoratus in his commentary on Vergil's Aeneid says that Populonia was founded later than the other cities by Corsicans, who were driven out by Etruscans from Volterra or by Volterraneans without the Corsican interlude. However, Populonia, is Villanovan in provenience. Moreover, no material remains of any Corsicans have been found or excavated, the tombs are unlike those of Volterra, and finally, between Populonia and Volterra, the former was by far the major settlement.

Strabo claimed that Populonia was the only Etruscan coastal city; the others were removed from the coast by several miles. He may not have known that Pisa had been a major Etruscan city before it was Roman. Pisa was built also in the Villanovan period on the delta of the Arno River and was a port during the floruit of Etruscan civilization. Spina also had been placed at the edge of the Po River. It has been termed by moderns the Etruscan Venice. As far as minor settlements are concerned, Pyrgi and Gravisca were Etruscan ports as early as any. By Strabo's time, the Romans had seized the entire coastline and had ejected the Etruscans from it. It is true that Etruscans preferred the most defensible positions on inland escarpments. If none were convenient or available they did not hesitate to settle in the plain or at the water's edge whether of lake or sea.

The metals industry
In geology, the "Tuscan metallogenic province" derived from volcanic intrusions into southern Etruria due to extension of the crust there (which also created a karst topography in western Italy) from the late Miocene to the Pleistocene. This process emplaced iron oxide deposits on Elba, pyrite in southern Tuscany and various kinds of skarn including copper-bearing in the Colline Metallifere, called Etruria Mineraria in the Middle Ages. The ancient slag-heaps are estimated to weigh 2–4 million tons, representing an annual iron production of between 1,600–2,000 and 10,000 tons, according to varying modern estimates.

Especially of interest to the Etruscans and later Romans of Populonia were the polymetallic ores of Campiglia Marittima, which contain copper, lead, zinc, iron, silver and tin; in short, all the ingredients bronze and steel with the added bonus of silver. The modern mine there descends from the ancient.

Feromin Co. removed mainly the iron slag from the shores of the Gulf of Baratti. Copper slag remains on the beach, which has been dated to the 9th and 8th centuries BC by radiocarbon methods; in other words, the city may have been founded to process ore.

Roman Populonia
Under Roman rule the harbour continued to be of some importance, and the place was already an episcopal see in the 6th century. The city was destroyed in 570 by the Lombards. The few survivors, led by bishop St. Cerbo, fled to the island of Elba, off the coast.

In literature

Populonia is mentioned in Horatius, the poem by English author Lord Macaulay: "From seagirt Populonia,/Whose sentinels descry/Sardinia's snowy mountain-tops/Fringing the southern sky", although Macaulay wrongly wrote that Sardinia is visible from it.

See also

 Archaeological Museum of Populonia
 Baratti and Populonia Archeological Park
 Baratti
 Etruscans
 Etruscan coins
 Piombino
 Populonia Stazione
 Volterra

References

Bibliography
 
 
Cambi, Franco, and Giorgia Maria Francesca Di Paola. (2013). "Etruscan Strategies of Defense: Late Classical and Early Hellenistic Hilltop Fortresses in the Territory of Populonia." Etruscan Studies 16 (2): 190–209.

External links

 
 
 

Frazioni of Piombino
Etruscan sites
Castles in Italy
Former populated places in Italy
Etruscan cities
Villanovan culture